1913 European Bandy Championships was the first, and so far the only, European Championship tournament in bandy. The competition was held in February 1913 in Saint-Moritz, Switzerland.

Background 
Modern bandy originated in England and the first rules were published in 1882. It soon became a popular sport in several Central and Northern European countries as well as in Russia. From 1901 bandy was played in the Scandinavian Nordic Games, which was the first international multi-sport event focused on winter sports. The rules differed between countries. Most popular was the 7 vs 7 game but Sweden, Finland and Russia preferred the 11 vs 11 rules. In some countries, like Latvia, bandy was played 9 vs 9.

Overview
The 1913 European Championships were arranged by the International Ice Hockey Federation established in 1908. Matches were played with 7-men teams. The number of participating teams was five.

Since Sweden and Russia followed the rules of 11-men teams, they rejected the invitation and competed in the 1913 Nordic Games in Stockholm. The German team consisted mostly of the members of Leipziger-HK, which was supposed to play in Stockholm as well, but because many of its players were selected for the German national team, they decided to travel to Saint-Moritz.

Aftermath 
The 1913 tournament was the peak for bandy in all of the participating nations, as the outburst of World War I put an end to the international competitions. After the war was over, International Olympic Committee included ice hockey to the 1920 Summer Olympics instead of bandy. This was because bandy was totally unknown in North America and because Antwerp had an ice hockey-sized indoor arena. The IOC decision caused the decline of bandy in Central Europe and Great Britain as the bandy players switched to ice hockey. After the 1920s, bandy was only played in the Soviet Union, Estonia, Latvia and three of the Nordic countries. In the 1930s, bandy also disappeared from Estonia and Latvia (it made a return there when they no longer were independent countries, but Soviet Republics). It was completely or almost forgotten in England, Italy, France, Switzerland and Belgium, which all took part at the 1913 European Championships. Austria, Hungary, Germany, the Netherlands and Slovakia (in 1913 a part of Austria-Hungary) were countries where bandy survived longer, well into the 1920s.

Revivals 

On 6 January 2014, the Federation of International Bandy arranged a four nation tournament in Davos to celebrate the anniversary of the 1913 European Championship. Czech Republic, Germany, Hungary and Netherlands played at the same venue as 101 years ago. The Dutch won this unofficial European Championship.

In 2016, a somewhat smaller tournament dubbed the Davos Cup was held with national teams from three European countries. This was won by Estonia.

See also
European Cup (bandy)

References 

Bandy competitions in Europe
International bandy competitions
International Ice Hockey Federation tournaments
1913 in bandy
1913 in Swiss sport
Sport in Davos
International bandy competitions hosted by Switzerland